Stirling Tolbooth is a municipal building in Broad Street, Stirling, Scotland. The structure, which was the original meeting place of Stirling Burgh Council, is a Category A listed building.

History

The first building on the site was a medieval tolbooth which was completed in 1473. After the old tolbooth became dilapidated in the late 17th century, burgh officials decided to procure a new structure: the new building was designed by Sir William Bruce in the Scottish baronial style, built by a master mason, Harry Livingstone, in ashlar stone and was completed in 1705.

The design involved an asymmetrical main frontage with a hall block of three bays and a six-stage tower facing onto Broad Street; the hall block featured a door in the right hand bay and sash windows with architraves in the other bays on three floors. The six-stage tower, which slightly projected forward, essentially survived intact from the 15th century structure although it had to be refaced. It featured a doorway on the ground floor, a niche on the first floor, sash windows on the second, third and fourth floors and clock faces on the fifth floor: it was surmounted with a belfry and a weather vane. The clock was designed and manufactured by Duncan Kerr of Falkirk. Internally, the principal rooms were the guardroom and cells on the ground floor and the courtroom, the robing room and the council chamber on the first floor. The council chamber contained some fine decorative plasterwork.

The building was extended to the east by three bays to a design by Gideon Gray in 1785, and a courthouse and prison block, designed by Richard Crichton, was built to the south of the original building and completed in 1811. John Baird and Andrew Hardie, who were leaders of the Radical forces in the Radical War, were imprisoned in the tollbooth for their role in the march on the Carron Company Ironworks in April 1820; they were tried and convicted of treason and then hanged and beheaded outside the tollbooth in September 1820.

The prisons inspector reporting on the poor state of the ground floor facilities in 1844 stated that "there has been no jail, to my knowledge, in which such a fearful state of things has existed as has been the case in the prison of Stirling." Following his report, all prisoners were transferred from the tollbooth to the new Stirling Jail in St John Street in 1847. The building ceased to be local seat of government when burgh leaders relocated to The Athenaeum in King Street in 1875, before moving on to the new Municipal Buildings in Corn Exchange Road in 1918. The courtroom was used as a venue for lectures and concerts, after a new courthouse was completed in Viewfield Place in 1876.

An extensive programme of refurbishment works, to a design by Richard Murphy Architects, to convert the building into an arts venue was completed in October 2000. The works involved the reuse of the courtroom as a performance space, the robing room as a bar and the council chamber as a restaurant.

See also
 List of Category A listed buildings in Stirling
 List of listed buildings in Stirling, Stirling

References

Government buildings completed in 1705
City chambers and town halls in Scotland
Buildings and structures in Stirling (city)
Category A listed buildings in Stirling (council area)
Clock towers in the United Kingdom